Frederiksted Historic District is a historic district located  on the island of Saint Croix  in the United States Virgin Islands.  It was listed on the U.S. National Register of Historic Places in 1976.

Frederiksted Historic District includes the original town laid out in a gridiron plan in 1751.  Fort Frederik, which now houses a museum, was the original focal point of the town plan.  The original buildings were destroyed in a fire in 1758. In 1878, plantation workers set fire to much of the town during the Fireburn insurrection. The fire damaged areas were rebuilt, with many of the buildings reflecting Georgian and  Late Victorian  architectural detailing. Significant buildings in the district include the Fort Frederik and the Customs House.

See also
 National Register of Historic Places listings in the United States Virgin Islands

References

External links
 
 The Vernacular Architecture of Fredrikstad Robert S. Brown (1978)

Saint Croix, U.S. Virgin Islands
Buildings and structures in the Danish West Indies
Historic districts on the National Register of Historic Places in the United States Virgin Islands
Historic American Buildings Survey in the United States Virgin Islands